The following is a comprehensive discography of Gary Numan, a British singer and musician. Numan (born Gary Webb, 1958) released his first record in 1978 as part of the outfit Tubeway Army. Initially unsuccessful, the band scored a huge hit in 1979 with the single "Are Friends Electric" and their second album Replicas, both of which reached number one in the UK. Numan then decided to release further recordings under his own name, beginning with the single "Cars" later in 1979. Both this and the subsequent album The Pleasure Principle also reached number one in the UK, and Numan became a leading force in the British electronic music scene. He scored a third number one album in 1980 with Telekon, and more hit singles and albums until the mid 1980s when his popularity waned. Despite this, he has continued to record and tour on a regular basis up to the present day. His 2017 studio album, Savage (Songs from a Broken World), entered the UK Albums Chart at no. 2, which was Numan's highest chart peak since 1980.  His most recent album, 2021's Intruder, also entered the UK charts at no. 2.

Albums

Studio albums

Extended studio albums 

All Extended albums re-released on CD later or on the specified year.

Berserker - all tracks extended except "Pump It Up" / "The God Film" / "A Child With The Ghost"

The Fury - all tracks extended

Machine & Soul - all tracks extended except the cover of "U Got The Look"

Sacrifice - all tracks extended

Exile -  all tracks extended

Live albums

 expanded and reissued as Living Ornaments '79 in 1998 and Living Ornaments '80 in 2005

Compilation albums

 Japanese 3 volume, 9 CD compilation of the first 8 studio albums (expanded) plus an edited combined version of Living Ornaments '79 and '80.

Soundtrack albums

Remix albums

Singles

† Non-album single except in US.

† Are "Friends" Electric? charts in the US but only in 1980.

 1978" (2/4/1983) – (12" vinyl only, reissued 1985 as 1978 Volume 1) – as Gary Numan and Tubeway Army UK #97
 "The Peel Sessions" (-/-/1989) – as Gary Numan and Tubeway Army – 'Cars' / 'Airlane' / 'Films' / 'Me I Disconnect From You' / 'Down in the Park' / 'I Nearly Married A Human'
 "Selection" (-/11/1989) – 'Cars ('E' Reg Extended Model)' / 'Down in the Park' / 'Are 'Friends' Electric?' / 'I Die: You Die' / 'We Are Glass' / 'Music For Chameleons'
 "1978–79 Volume 2" (16 March 1985) – (12" vinyl only) – as Gary Numan and Tubeway Army UK #76
 "1978–79 Volume 3" (23 March 1985) – (12" vinyl only) – as Gary Numan and Tubeway Army UK #82
 "The Live EP" (25 May 1985) – 'Are 'Friends' Electric?' / 'Berserker' / 'Cars' / 'We Are Glass' UK #27
 "Dream Corrosion – The Live EP" (7/8/1994) – 'Noise Noise' / 'It Must Have Been Years' / 'I'm An Agent' / 'Jo The Waiter' UK#95
 "Dark Light – The Live EP" (21 May 1995) – 'Bleed' / 'Every Day I Die' / 'The Dream Police' / 'Listen to the Sirens' UK#92
 "Babylon 1" (-/-/1995) – 'Berserker' / 'My Dying Machine' / 'Empty Bed, Empty Heart' / 'Here Am I' / 'She Cries' / 'Rumour'
 "Babylon 2" (-/-/1995) – 'Your Fascination' / 'Call Out The Dogs' / 'We Need It' / 'Anthem' / 'This Ship Comes Apart' / 'Mistasax 1'
 "Babylon 3" (-/-/1995) – 'Miracles' / 'I Still Remember' / 'The Fear (95 Remix)' / 'Puppets' / 'Tribal' / 'Shame'
 "Babylon 4" (-/-/1995) – 'This Is Love' / 'I Can't Stop' / 'Survival' / 'Faces' / 'Time To Die' / 'Mistasax 2'
 "Babylon 5" (-/-/1995) – 'New Anger' / 'America' / 'Heart' / 'I Don't Believe' / 'Children' / 'Icehouse' / 'Tread Careful'
 "Babylon 6" (-/-/1995) – 'The Skin Game' / 'Emotion' / 'Dark Mountain' / 'In A Glasshouse' / 'Hanoi' / 'River'
 "Babylon 7" (-/-/1995) – 'Machine And Soul' / 'A Question of Faith' / 'The Hauntings' / 'Metal Beat' / 'Whisper of Truth' / 'Play Like God' / 'Absolution'
 "Dominion Day" (-/-/1998) (US only CD EP) – 'Dominion Day (Extended)' / 'Metal (20th Anniversary Version' / 'Down in the Park (20th Anniversary Version)' / 'Dominion Day (Live)' / 'Dominion Day (Video Edit)' / 'Voix (20th Anniversary Version)' / 'Dead Heaven (Extended)' / 'Cars (Live)'
  The Babylon series are fanclub only CD EPs featuring (then) exclusive to CD 12" versions, b-sides and rare tracks. 'This Ship Comes Apart' from 1985, remains exclusive to 'Babylon 2'. Although credited as such, 'I Still Remember' was not the 12" version.
  The Dominion Day US CD EP incorrectly lists only seven tracks and in the incorrect order.
 The Fallen (11/9/2018) (EP complementing "Savage (Songs from a Broken World)") – 'It Will End Here' / 'The Promise' / 'If We Had Known' / 'It Will End Here' (3:48 edit – digital only)

Collaborations or as featured artist
Albums and singles by other artists on which Numan appears in some form.

† "Stormtrooper in Drag" was originally a stand-alone single but has since been included as a bonus track on CD versions of Numan's 1981 album Dance as well as various Numan compilation albums

† "Change Your Mind" released in 1985 with Bill Sharpe's solo album "Famous People" with no chart success, later packaged with the collaboration album "Automatic" which charted in 1989 at 59.

† "New Thing From London Town" had alterations to the lyrics on the album version of the single release.

† "Voices" released in 1987 as a standalone single, later repackaged later packaged with the collaboration album "Automatic" which charted in 1989 at 59.

† "No More Lies" released in 1988 as a standalone single, later repackaged later packaged with the collaboration album "Automatic" which charted in 1989 at 59.

Covers by Numan

Notable covers and samples of Numan

Cover songs

Top of the Pops appearances

Music videos

VHS\DVD releases

Explanatory notes

References

 
 
Discographies of British artists
Pop music discographies
Rock music discographies
New wave discographies